The Erie Express are a professional American football team based in Erie, Pennsylvania. They compete in the Gridiron Developmental Football League (GDFL) as a member of the Eastern Xtreme West Division. Founded in 2011, the Express are the reigning 2021 GDFL champions. The team plays at Saxon Stadium, a football venue on the campus of Mercyhurst University in Erie.

The "Express" name alludes to Erie being a long-time hub for trains and rail transportation. In 1910, GE Transportation built a locomotive assembly plant in nearby Lawrence Park and designed the entire company town there, which is still in operation today. Erie also has a storied regional history of trains, especially the Erie Gauge War (1853–54).

History

Prior to the Erie Express' GDFL national championship in 2021, they had reached the national semi-finals twice, in 2018 and 2019.

In 2019, the Express rostered Glen Conner Jr. as a defensive lineman, wearing the number 23. In their 30–6 victory over the Westmoreland Wolves on April 22, 2019, the Express honored Glen as their "Defensive Player of the Week" with seven tackles, three tackles for loss (−16 yards), three sacks, and an interception. Glen is the oldest brother of the National Football League (NFL) running back James Conner, an Erie native who played for local McDowell High School Trojans before committing to the University of Pittsburgh Panthers (2013–2016). James went on to play in the NFL for the Pittsburgh Steelers (2017–2020) and the Arizona Cardinals (2021–present).

Since 2016 the Express hosting the Covato Classic each year, a game in memory of former Erie player Tyler Covato who was killed in a work accident.

2021 National Championship season

The Erie Express defeated the Columbus Fire (Columbus, Ohio) at Erie Veterans Memorial Stadium to win the Xtreme Conference title, advancing to the GDFL National Championship for the first time. On September 5, 2021, at Saxon Stadium, they proceeded to win the GDFL championship with a 42–40 victory over Inglewood Blackhawks, a team from Inglewood, California in the Greater Los Angeles region (Inglewood is also home to the Los Angeles Chargers and the Los Angeles Rams of the NFL, playing at SoFi Stadium).

The Erie Express advanced to the USA Bowl XV Summer National Championship Game at Daytona Stadium in Daytona Beach, Florida versus the Iredell Warriors (Iredell County, North Carolina), in the Charlotte metropolitan area. The Express arrived to the game with an overall 13–0 record, while the Warriors were 12–1 in the Carolinas Elite Football Alliance. On January 15, 2022, the Express overcame the Warriors by a single point, 25–24.

Logos and uniforms

The primary colors of the Erie Express are navy blue, red, and silver. They mirror the colors found in the City of Erie flag. The primary logo features a metallic football player's face capped with a train wedge plow and a smokestack in the team's colors above the "Erie Express" wordmark. The secondary logo, found on the jersey sleeves, includes a Pennsylvania keystone in navy blue, charged with a silver E resembling an industrial wedge plow.

The helmets are silver with a red facemask, featuring a navy blue and red horizontal striping and a collegiate E logo on both sides in white on red. This helmet design resembles the one introduced by the Navy Midshipmen football team for the 2012 Army–Navy Game. The home uniforms include a navy blue jersey with broad silver and red stripes sweeping over the shoulders. The secondary logo features prominently on the sleeves. The numbers and player names are in red with white outline. The pants are silver with navy-red-navy side stripes. The away uniforms feature a white jersey with red stripes and numbers outlined in navy blue. The Express wears either red or white pants for this jersey. For the 2021 USA Bowl, the Express wore red jerseys charged with white and navy blue Northwestern stripes.

Home venues

 Saxon Stadium (1,100), 2021–present
 Erie Veterans Memorial Stadium (10,000), select home games, 2021–present
 Erie Sports Center, practice facility, 2021–present
 Gus Anderson Field (2011–2020)

References

External links 
 

American football teams established in 2011